Sarah Kathryn Hammer (born August 18, 1983) is a former American professional racing cyclist and four-times Olympic silver medalist. With eight world championships, she has been called, "America's most decorated track athlete."
Hammer announced her retirement from professional Cycling on September 23, 2017.

Career
Hammer is five-times a champion (2006, 2007, 2010, 2011 & 2013) in the individual pursuit and twice a champion (2013 & 2014) in the omnium at the UCI Track Cycling World Championships.

At the 2008 Summer Olympics, Hammer finished fifth overall in the individual pursuit and did not finish in the points race.

At the 2012 Summer Olympics, Hammer won a team silver medal in the Women's team pursuit, as well as an individual silver medal in the women's omnium.
  
Hammer held the world record in the 3000 m individual pursuit from 2010 until it was broken by Chloé Dygert in 2018.

Hammer announced her retirement from professional Cycling on September 23, 2017.

Major results

2013
Los Angeles Grand Prix
1st Omnium
2nd Team Pursuit (with Kimberly Geist, Jennifer Valente and Ruth Winder)
2014
1st Omnium, Los Angeles Grand Prix
2015
Pan American Track Championships
1st  Omnium
1st  Team Pursuit (with Kelly Catlin, Ruth Winder and Jennifer Valente)
Pan American Games
1st  Omnium
2nd  Team Pursuit (with Kelly Catlin, Lauren Tamayo, Ruth Winder and Jennifer Valente)
Independence Day Grand Prix
1st Individual Pursuit
1st Points Race
1st Scratch Race
1st Omnium, Marymoor Grand Prix
2nd Omnium, Grand Prix of Colorado Springs
2017 
 Belgian International Track Meeting
 1st Points Race
3rd Scratch Race
 2nd  Points race, UCI World Track Championships

References

External links
Official web site of Sarah Hammer

Sarah Hammer at the United States Olympic Committee

1983 births
Living people
American female cyclists
Cyclists at the 2008 Summer Olympics
Cyclists at the 2012 Summer Olympics
Cyclists at the 2016 Summer Olympics
UCI Track Cycling World Champions (women)
Sportspeople from Redondo Beach, California
Olympic silver medalists for the United States in cycling
Medalists at the 2012 Summer Olympics
Medalists at the 2016 Summer Olympics
Cyclists at the 2015 Pan American Games
Pan American Games medalists in cycling
Pan American Games gold medalists for the United States
Pan American Games silver medalists for the United States
American track cyclists
Medalists at the 2015 Pan American Games
21st-century American women
Cyclists from California